Zlatan is a male given name of Slavic origin meaning Golden. The name is common amongst all South Slavic countries, namely in Bosnia and Herzegovina, Bulgaria, Croatia, North Macedonia and Serbia. The name is found in particularly high frequencies in Bosnia because it is considered ethnically neutral amongst the three dominant Bosnian ethnicities: Bosniaks, Serbs and Croats. The name is derived from the South Slavic word zlato - from the Old Slavic root zolto (gold).

People
Zlatan Alomerović (born 1991), German football player of Bosniak descent
Zlatan Arnautović (born 1956), Serbian handball player
Zlatan Azinović (born 1988), Swedish football player of Bosnian descent
Zlatan Bajramović (born 1979), Bosnian football player and coach
Zlatan Čolaković (1955–2008), Croatian and Bosnian researcher
Zlatan Dudov (1903–1963), Bulgarian film director
Zlatan Ibrahimović (born 1981) Swedish football player of Bosnian and Croatian descent
Zlatan Krizanović (born 1991), Swedish football player
Zlatan Ljubijankić (born 1983), Slovenian football player of Bosnian descent
Zlatan Muslimović (born 1981), Bosnian football player
Zlatan Saračević (born 1956), Bosnian shot putter
Zlatko Saračević (1961–2021), Croatian handball player (birth name Zlatan)
Zlatan Stipišić Gibonni (born 1968), Croatian musician
Zlatan Stoykov (born 1951), Bulgarian general
Zlatan Vanev (born 1973), Bulgarian weightlifter
Zlatan Ibile (born 1995), Nigerian singer

See also

Slavic names

Slavic masculine given names
Bosnian masculine given names
Bulgarian masculine given names
Croatian masculine given names
Macedonian masculine given names
Montenegrin masculine given names
Slovene masculine given names
Serbian masculine given names
Masculine given names